Velyka Oleksandrivka (or , Velikaya Aleksandrovka) is an urban-type settlement in Beryslav Raion, Kherson Oblast, southern Ukraine. It hosts the administration of Velyka Oleksandrivka settlement hromada, one of the hromadas of Ukraine. The settlement is located on the left bank of the Inhulets. It has a population of

Administrative status 
Until 18 July, 2020, Velyka Oleksandrivka was the administrative center of Velyka Oleksandrivka Raion. The raion was abolished in July 2020 as part of the administrative reform of Ukraine, which reduced the number of raions of Kherson Oblast to five. The area of Velyka Oleksandrivka Raion was merged into Beryslav Raion.

History

2022 Russian invasion of Ukraine

In March 2022, Velyka Oleksandrivka was occupied by Russian forces. On 4 October 2022, Ukrainian authorities regained control of the settlement during the Southern counteroffensive.

Climate

Economy

Transportation
Velyka Oleksandrivka is on a paved road which connects Novovorontsovka and Beryslav, where it has access to Kherson.

See also 

 Russian occupation of Kherson Oblast

References

Urban-type settlements in Beryslav Raion
Khersonsky Uyezd